Gopi Kukde is a veteran of the Indian advertising industry. His most innovative and successful creations is the Onida Devil.

He is a Gold medalist from Sir J.J. Institute of Applied Art for his college campaign for the film Meera, by Gulzar. His career marked his association with leading ad agencies like Chaitra, Clarion and Everest, and JWT. In 1982, he founded the Advertising Avenues, with two others Gautam Rakshit and Ashok Roy. Campaigns he has contributed to include Asian Paints, Glaxo, Stanrose Fabrics, Centaur Hotel, and the Hawkins pressure cooker. At Avenues, he worked on UFO Jeans, Skypak Couriers, Paan Pasand and Onida"Neighbours envy owners pride". He has produced and directed ad-films for Avenues for various brands.

Apart from Art Direction, he has created catchy one-liners. His famous one-liners include the Pan Pasand one-liner, '’’Shaadi aur tumse kabhi nahin’’', '’’Chane ke bhaw kaaju’’' and the Onida Devil saying ‘’‘Neighbour’s Envy, Owner’s Pride.’’’

Achievements
He has had a long association with the Mumbai based organization CAG - Communication Arts Guild of which he was also the President. He is today one of the committee members of that guild. Gopi has won several CAG & Ad Club awards in appreciation of his creative talent.

He stated in an interview with the Hindu group of publications, "My motto in life is if you don't understand something, don't do it. Do something you are good at and be happy." After 16 years of experience in different agencies and producing award winning works, Kukde took a 10-year sabbatical to work on what he enjoys the most - ceramics. He has a studio in Mumbai called Useless Ceramics.

Notes

External links
 "Should ideas be researched?". 7 January 2007. Nita J. Kulkarni. A Wide Angle View of India blog.
 "AD Legends". advertising.indiabizclub.com.

Indian advertising executives
Businesspeople from Mumbai
Living people
Year of birth missing (living people)